Halle, Germany may refer to:

 Halle, Saxony-Anhalt, also called Halle an der Saale, or Halle (Saale)
 Halle, North Rhine-Westphalia, also called Halle in Westfalen, or Halle (Westfalen)
 Halle, Bentheim, in the district of Bentheim, Lower Saxony
 Halle, Holzminden, in the district of Holzminden, Lower Saxony

See also
Halle (disambiguation)